Bhajanlal Bishnoi (6 October 1930 – 3 June 2011) was a politician and three-time chief minister of the Indian state of Haryana. He became the Chief Minister for the first time in 1979, was re-elected in 1982, and became the chief minister for the third time by winning the elections in 1991. He also served as the Minister of Agriculture and the Minister of Environment and Forests in the Rajiv Gandhi government.

Early life
Bhajan Lal Bishnoi was born in a Bishnoi  family on 6 October 1930 in the Koranwali village of British India's Bahawalpur princely state, which is now in Pakistan.He received his formal education in Bahawalnagar. Lal lived under difficult circumstances and had to sell his wares on a cycle to make a living. He married Jasma Devi, with whom he had two sons - Chander Mohan Bishnoi and Kuldip Bishnoi and a daughter, Roshni.

Bhajan Lal moved to Adampur after the Partition. At the age of 17 he began buying and selling goods at his village market, he soon started a shop in partnership with Pokhar Mal who was a local trader. Both of them worked as commission agents (intermediaries between the fanner and the wholesaler), this work got him into trouble with the local police. He initially joined politics to protect himself from the police. The police had 12 criminal cases and charges against him, all of which were dropped once he became a MLA.

Political career
Lal started his political career by becoming a village sarpanch and later the chairman of the panchayat samiti of Hisar. He joined the Congress Party, and became the president of the Congress Mandal in the region. He was elected to the Haryana Assembly for the first time in 1968 after winning the mid-term polls in Adampur. He retained this seat for the remainder of his political career except in 1987 when his wife won the seat.

Janata Party 
In 1977 elections he contested under a Janata Party ticket and won the elections. Under the new Janata Party government of Devi Lal, Bhajan Lal was given a number of ministries including the ministry of dairy development and animal husbandry, the ministry of labour and employment, and the forests ministry. However in 1979 he defected to the Congress along with a group of MLAs thereby toppling the Janata Party government.

First and Second Terms as Chief Minister 
Following his defection to the Congress he became the Chief Minister of Haryana with a razor thin majority. In 1980 following the victory of Indira Gandhi led Congress (I) in the general elections, many Janata Party leaders began to defect, by then he was able to get as many as 40 Janata Party MLAs into the Congress and secured a strong majority of 50 MLAs in an assembly of 90 MLAs. He had achieved this despite his rival Devi Lal resorting to guarding his 42 Janata Party MLAs in a farmhouse with guards armed with submachine guns. He offered the defecting MLAs land, money, positions in state corporations and boards, and cabinet positions to this end he had expanded the number of cabinet ministries to 26 which made every second congress MLA a minister. He also held control over the state's Criminal Investigation Department, which he used to his advantage by filing cases against he rivals to pressure them into withdrawing or joining him.  This horse trading during his first term had led to the Hindustan Times calling him the "master of horse-trading".

Bhajan Lal's record on governance and the economy however was seen as poor at the time with state corporations and boards seeing sharp declines in their surpluses and no addition of new electricity generation capacity in the state during his initial years of rule between 1979-1982. He was re-elected on May 23, 1982 and served until July 1986.

1987 Elections 
Although he did not lead the party into the 1987 elections, the electoral rout of the Congress in that elections resulted in him being slowly sidelined in the party in favour of newer leaders like Bhupinder Hooda.

Union Minister and National Politics 
In 1986 following the end of his tenure as Chief Minister, he was made a Rajya Sabha MP, and was appointed as the Union Minister of Environment and Forests under the Rajiv Gandhi government. In 1988 he was made the Union Minister of Agriculture. In 1989 he was elected to the Lok Sabha after winning in the constituency of Faridabad.

Third Term as Chief Minister 
He resigned from the Lok Sabha and contested the Haryana Assembly elections held in 1991 from Adampur, Congress won the elections and he was made the chief minister for the third time. However, in the 1996 elections the Congress suffered a major defeat, and Bhajan Lal never became a chief minister following that.

Leaving the Congress 
The victory of the Indian National Congress in Haryana's 2005 elections caused a major rift in its state unit, as it opted to make Bhupinder Hooda, a Jat, the Chief Minister instead of Lal. In 2007, Lal officially announced he would form a new party, called the Haryana Janhit Congress. The key event that brought this about was the suspension of his son Kuldeep Bishnoi from the Indian National Congress, for criticizing the party's central leaders.

2009 Lok Sabha Elections

He fought the 2009 Lok Sabha election despite being 79 years old at the time, stating that he was still "young enough to win elections". He fought from Hissar and defeated Sampat Singh, INLD leader by 6983 votes, Jai parkash of Congress came at third position in a high-profile battle.

Death
Bhajan Lal died on 3 June 2011 in Hisar following a heart attack.

See also
 Aaya Ram Gaya Ram
 Dynastic politics of Haryana

References

People from Panchkula
Chief Ministers of Haryana
India MPs 2009–2014
1930 births
2011 deaths
India MPs 1989–1991
India MPs 1998–1999
People from Bahawalpur District
Lok Sabha members from Haryana
Chief ministers from Indian National Congress
Agriculture Ministers of India
Members of the Cabinet of India
Chief ministers from Janata Party
Haryana MLAs 1972–1977
Haryana MLAs 1977–1982
Haryana MLAs 1982–1987
Haryana MLAs 1987–1991
Haryana MLAs 1991–1996
Haryana MLAs 1996–2000
Haryana MLAs 2000–2005
Haryana Janhit Congress politicians
Indian National Congress politicians
Politicians from Faridabad